William Miles was launched at Bristol in 1816 as a West Indiaman. She remained a West Indiaman until 1846, though she did make some voyages to Archangel and to the Baltic. New owners from 1846 sailed her to Quebec and North America. She underwent lengthening in 1854. Thereafter, a sequence of owners sailed her to India and the Mediterranean. She was wrecked on 9 August 1883.

Career
William Miles first appeared in Lloyd's Register (LR) in 1816.

Between 1851 and 1853, William Miles was not listed. In 1854 she reappeared, having undergone lengthening that under the pre-1836 method of calculation  doubled her burthen.  

William Miles received sheathing with yellow metal.

Fate
William Miles stranded near Porthcawl in the Bristol Channel on 9 Aug 1883. The Royal National Lifeboat Institution lifeboat Chafyn Grove rescued all twelve people on board. William Miles was on a voyage from Havre de Grâce to Swansea. The lifeboat first took off the mate's wife and a seaman; the rest of the crew refused to leave. When the winds increased the lifeboat came back and took off the remaining crew.

Her entry in Lloyd's Register for 1883 carried the annotation "Lost".

Citations

References
 
 

1816 ships
Ships built in Bristol
Age of Sail merchant ships of England
Maritime incidents in August 1883